Zi or ZI may refer to:

 Zi (surname) (子), a surname used by Shang kings
 Zi (title) (子), a Chinese honorific used for ancient viscounts and for master philosophers
 Zi (name) (字), an alternate term for East Asian courtesy names
 Zi (cuneiform), a sign in cuneiform writing
 Zi Corporation, a Canadian software company
 Zi (album), a 2016 album by Negură Bunget
 Zi (prefix symbol) of the binary unit prefix zebi for digital data
 Zi (Zoids), a fictional planet in the Zoids media franchise
 Zona incerta, a region in the subthalamus
 Aigle Azur (IATA airline code)
 Thracian form of Sky Father Dyēus.

See also
 Chinese characters, sometimes known as zi (字) in Chinese